A stirrup spout vessel (so called because of its resemblance to a stirrup) is a type of ceramic vessel common among several Pre-Columbian cultures of South America beginning in the early 2nd millennium BCE.

These cultures included the Chavin and the Moche. In these vessels the stirrup handle actually forms part of the spout, which emanates from the top of the stirrup. The jars, which were often elaborately figurative, would be cast from a mold, while the stirrup spout was built by hand and welded to the vessel with slip.

Moche Culture and Stirrup Spout Vessels 
In the river valleys of the North Coast of Peru, the Moche (moh’-chay) culture grew and flourished at around c. AD 100. For nearly 600 years the Moche culture developed and expanded throughout the major river valleys in the dry coastal plains of Peru. The Moche built large monumental temples, vast irrigation canals and systems, and an impressive wealth of artwork and ceramics. 

Moche artwork provided an extremely varied account of activities done throughout the time, and important figures and resources. Moche artwork included men, women, plants, gods and deities, and anthropomorphic figures engaging in activities such as hunting, fishing, combat, sexual acts, warfare, and ceremonial events. Archaeology regarding the Moche has been able to uncover a vast amount of artwork, mostly through the survival of Moche ceramics. The Moche were especially adept at the creation of stirrup spout vessels. They used them largely for the creation of fine wares, but also for intricately sculpted forms such as portraits of Moche leaders. Stirrup spout vessels appeared early in the Andean region. They can be formed in spherical, oblate, cylindrical, cube-like, angled, or molded forms. The Moche created thousands of these stirrup spout vessels throughout the duration of the culture. These were used for both practical as well as artistic purposes. 

There are two main classifications of stirrup spout vessels in Moche ceramics. One form was the process of creating a three-dimensional mold and using this to form the clay into an intricate image or figure. One of the most popular Moche ceramic styles was the creation of what is now called Moche portrait vessels. These vessels were extremely detailed and intricate, usually depicting the heads and figures of adult men. Because of the detailed nature of these vessels, it is believed that they are depictions of real, high-ranking, men throughout the Moche culture. 

The second classification of Moche ceramics is the creation of Fineline painting on pottery. This artistic style provides a wealth of information regarding life and beliefs throughout the Moche culture. It supplies information on Pre-Columbian daily life, narrative mythology, and ritual practices throughout the region. These Fineline paintings have been given five different categories by researchers Christopher B. Donnan and Donna McClelland, including Vessel Forms, Daily Life, the Natural World, the Supernatural, and Narrative Themes.

Erotic Moche Ceramics
Thousands of stirrup spout vessels have been discovered, with at least 500 pieces displaying sexual or erotic scenes. Although these ceramics display a large range of sexual and erotic imagery and iconography, reproductive sex (penile penetration of the vagina) is rarely depicted. The most common vessel designs focus on positions of anal sex and fellatio. However, other subjects matters include gods, deities, hunting, fishing, sacrifice, combat, burial themes, social activities, warfare, dancing skeletons, and animal copulation, including scenes of mice and monkeys. Specific sex-themed vessel styles do appear more frequently. This is evidence of the use of ceramic workshops being active for some time to allow for the mass production of these vessels, possibly using molds. These pots provide archaeologist with insight into the Moche's, and other pre-Columbian cultures, beliefs towards reproduction and sexual practices. These artifacts show practices such as androgyny (both male and female genitals), hermaphroditism, and sexually transmitted infections such as syphilis. Many of these vessels are on full display at the Larco Museum in Lima Peru. Here there is an entire gallery dedicated to erotic artwork and pottery from the Moche people.

A large portion of these pieces were supplied to the elite members of society. Through the discovery of erotic ceramic ware in elite tombs, archaeologists have concluded that the Moche buried their high-ranking individuals with these sexual pots, as well as in some sacrificial rituals. Ritual paraphernalia and elaborate garments and ornaments were also discovered.

Water Theme in Moche Ceramics 
The Moche's territory was exposed to drastic climate variations, super dry summers, and rainy winters. However, occasional El Niño events disrupted this flow, either through exceptionally long droughts, or periods of devastating floods. The manipulation of water became very important to the Moche not only to survive, but to flourish. The Moche's agricultural yields were a major source of wealth, both through production and trade. This came because of an immense irrigation canal system that brought water from lush valleys to the surrounding towns and villages. The canals supported urban centers, used to grow corn (maize), beans, and other crops, and helped in periods of severe drought. Access to a reliable water source was also important in order for the Moche to grow and develop as a society, especially if they wanted to adapt into a sedentary society.

This manipulation of water has also been demonstrated in the Moche's ceramic work. Apart from the more commonly known scenes of sexual ceramics, the spout design of these pieces have also been curiously interpreted. Water is essential for survival, and to survive in dry conditions, the Moche manipulated water from rivers and valleys to desired sites. This manipulation shows up in the design of the spouts of their ceramic work. As a piece is turned to pour water out, or filled, the Moche used a stirrup spout design, a circular design, to allow for water to flow out both and either side.

Moche Ceramic Fineline Painting
While there has been no identifiable language associated with the Moche, their artforms such as pottery and ceramics provide scholars with a look into the practices and customs of the Moche culture. From these ceramic forms, such as Fineline painting on stirrup spout vessels, archeologists can begin to understand aspects of Moche daily life, mythology, and narrative myth. One of the most essential steps in understanding the iconography of these vessels is the creation of “rollouts” of the iconography painted on the vessel. Christopher B. Donnan and Donna McClelland have both worked throughout their careers to photograph and record Moche iconography of these vessels in their rolled-out forms. In this form, the narrative aspect and storytelling ability of the stirrup spout vessels can be clearly identified. 

Several key themes have thus been recognized across the iconography found from Moche sites. The iconography on these stirrup spout vessels shows a wide range of activities from the Moche. It shows eating practices and foodways of the Moche, Weaving, warfare, hunting, and even dress and ornaments. There are several larger themes found throughout several vessels. An excellent example of this can be found in a Moche stirrup spout vessel which is known as the Presentation Theme (seen in the figure to the side). Here the iconography shows several figures participating in what is meant to be ritual sacrifice, and the drinking of blood. In the bottom scene, several bound prisoners are being decapitated by their captors, while several ornate figures in the scene above pass around a goblet. 

There has been debate whether or not the ornate figures represent gods and deities, or whether they were high-ranking Moche officials in costume. This comes from the excavation of the Moche site at Sipán. Here the remains of a Moche leader were found, buried in the costume of the Rayed Deity found within the Presentation Theme. This discovery changed the way that many archeologists approached the narrative themes within the Moche iconography. After this discovery, two realms of thought came into play. The first being the continuation that this was in fact showing a deity to the Moche and that the remains of the “Lord of Sipán” were merely clothed in the same costume to resemble the deity. The other being that the scene did not show the deities or pantheon of the Moche, and instead was a literal interpretation of events. It was a record of history.

This theme, much like others, shows a natural progression and narrative format. Again, while there is no written documentation from the Moche the iconography on stirrup spout vessels, and other pottery, provides scholars with a story of Moche beliefs and practices. From the identification of the iconography on this vessel, scholars are able to understand Moche activities such as warfare, human sacrifice, and ceremonial practices. The figures or deities shown in the Presentation Theme can be found in several other themes and scenes from Moche stirrup spout vessel iconography. Several of the key figures within the Presentation Theme have also been identified within the Scene of Sacrifice. These are not the only identified themes though present throughout Moche Fineline paintings in stirrup spout vessels. There is also the Burial Theme, The Revolt of the Objects, the Tule Boat Theme, and the Runner Theme.

See also
 Double spout and bridge vessel, another common type of vessel from Pre-Columbian South America
 Stirrup jar, a similarly named vessel of Mediterranean origin
 Moche Crawling Feline

References

History of ceramics
Moche culture
History of South America
Pre-Columbian pottery
Drinkware